The Fitzroy Channel is a river in the Magallanes y la Antártica Chilena Region in southern Chile.

References

External links

 El canal Fitz Roy, by Silvestre Fugellie in Chilean Newspaper La Prensa Austral on 11 Juli 2012

Rivers of Chile